Fox 32 may refer to one of the following television stations in the United States, affiliated with the Fox Broadcasting Company:

Current
WFLD in Chicago, Illinois (O&O)
WFQX-TV in Cadillac, Michigan

Former
KBTZ-LP in Bozeman, Montana
Was translator for KBTZ in Butte, Montana (2003 to 2009)
WXGZ (now WACY-TV) in Appleton/Green Bay, Wisconsin (1986 to 1992)